Type 50 may refer to:
 Bugatti Type 50, motor vehicle produced by the auto-maker Bugatti
 Peugeot Typ 50, motor vehicle produced by the auto-maker Peugeot
 Steyr 50, a small car released in 1936 by the Austrian automobile manufacturer Steyr
 Type 50, a Chinese licensed copy of the Soviet submachine gun PPSh-41
 GMA T.50, a car designed by Gordon Murray